Ultraviolet is the fourth extended play by American electronica project Owl City, released digitally on June 27, 2014, through Republic Records. The EP's lead single, "Beautiful Times", which features violinist Lindsey Stirling, was released on April 8, 2014.

Background and release
In early 2014, Young revealed the album artwork for his single, "Beautiful Times", through his Instagram account. The song, which was released on April 8, would act as the lead single for Ultraviolet and features music by violinist Lindsey Stirling. Following the release of "Beautiful Times", Young stated his intent to release a steady "series of EPs" in 2014 rather than one larger recording. On June 5, it was announced that the EP would be released on June 27. The album art and track listing, as well as a clip of one of the songs, were released on June 10 as part of a social media marketing campaign to promote the release of the EP.

On June 17, the EP was released for pre-order on iTunes. On June 18, Owl City premiered a new track, "Wolf Bite" days before the release of the EP. Starting on June 19, through many forms of social media, Young stated the official music video for "Beautiful Times" will be premiering on June 26. On June 25, the day before the premiere, Young posted a preview from the video. The "Beautiful Times" music video debuted the next day, as expected, via Rolling Stone. The EP peaked No. 30 on the Billboard 200 chart. "Beautiful Times" eventually peaked at position 91 on the Japan Hot 100 chart.

On July 17, Owl City released a visualizer video for the song "Wolf Bite" premiering on MetroLyrics.com through Vevo. On August 1, the a visualizer video for "Up All Night" was released. Adam Young has expressed his interest to create respective visualizers for each song in this EP. On August 29, the video for "This Isn't The End" was released and serves as the last visualizer for the EP. The song was also included on the subsequent studio album, Mobile Orchestra.

Composition
Adam Young wrote and produced the EP entirely by himself. According to Young, the EP is a "deeper venture into EDM" and has a more "edgier sound to Owl City than experienced before."

Critical reception
Ultraviolet was generally met with positive reviews. Fred Thomas of AllMusic stated, "Ultraviolets high point was first song and subsequent single 'Beautiful Times', a bounding pop track marked by soaring string arrangements from guest violinist Lindsey Stirling." Marcus Floyd of Renowned for Sound remarked, "There are definitely some different sounds being experimented here with Ultraviolet, standing out from the light hearted pop previously tapped into by Owl City."

Track listing

Charts

Music videosAudio'

References

Owl City albums